The 1994 Damallsvenskan was the seventh season of the Damallsvenskan. Matches were played between 23 April and 22 October  1994. Malmö FF won the title by four points from Hammarby. Gideonsbergs IF finished third. This was the first and only time that the two teams who have played in every Damallsvenskan season finished in the top two places. Östers IF and Västerås BK were promoted before the season started. Västerås went straight back down again, along with Wä IF.

Table

References

Damallsvenskan seasons
1994 in association football
1994 in Swedish sport